Chris H. Wilson is a Republican member of the Utah Senate, representing the 2nd District since 2023. He previously represented the 25th District prior to redistricting.

Personal life
Wilson was born in Logan, Utah and raised working for his family's car dealership, Wilson Motors Company. He attended Utah State University and in 2009 bought his family car dealership from his father. He then served as president of the New Car Dealers of Utah during the 2019 term.

Political career

In 2020, Wilson announced he would run again the incumbent republican, Lyle W. Hillyard who had been unchallenged in a primary for 35 years. Wilson, ran on a platform of pushing for term limits for state legislators, directly criticizing his predecessor for staying in office for as long as he did, even though Wilson had supported Hillyard in the past. Wilson claimed he was inspired to run after seeing his predecessors tax reform votes, and described the incumbent, Hillyard, as "out of touch." He beat Democrat Nancy Huntly in the November 2020 election to the Utah State Senate. He represents the 25th district, which covers Cache, and Rich counties.

Electoral record

References

External links
 Chris Wilson at Ballotpedia
 Campaign Site: Chris Wilson for Utah

Republican Party Utah state senators
Year of birth missing (living people)
Living people
21st-century American politicians